Heung Yuen Wai is a walled village in Ta Kwu Ling, North District, Hong Kong.

Administration
Heung Yuen Wai is a recognized village under the New Territories Small House Policy. It is one of the villages represented within the Ta Kwu Ling District Rural Committee. For electoral purposes, Heung Yuen Wai is part of the Sha Ta constituency, which is currently represented by Ko Wai-kei.

History
Heung Yuen Wai is a village of the Man Clan established around 1825. It appears on the "Map of the San-On District", published in 1866 by Simeone Volonteri.

See also
 Walled villages of Hong Kong
 Man Uk Pin
 Lin Ma Hang
 Heung Yuen Wai Control Point

References

External links

 Delineation of area of existing village Heung Yuen Wai (Ta Kwu Ling) for election of resident representative (2019 to 2022)

Walled villages of Hong Kong
Villages in North District, Hong Kong